André Elissen (born 12 February 1960 in Frechen, Germany) is a Dutch politician and consultant as well as police officer. As a member of the Party for Freedom (Partij voor de Vrijheid) he was an MP from 17 June 2010 to 19 September 2012. He focused on matters of constitutional law, local government finance, the Dutch Royal House, counter-terrorism, emergency management and the Dutch secret service.

References 
  Parlement.com biography

1960 births
Living people
Dutch consultants
Dutch police officers
Members of the House of Representatives (Netherlands)
Party for Freedom politicians
People from Frechen
MEPs for the Netherlands 2014–2019